Sir Burton P. C. Hall, (born December 10, 1947 in Nassau, The Bahamas) is a Judge of the UN International Residual Mechanism for Criminal Tribunals.  He is the presiding judge in the case of the Prosecutor v. Jovica Stanišić and Franko Simatović. He previously served as a Judge of the International Criminal Tribunal for the Former Yugoslavia, a position he was elected to in August, 2009. Hall served as a Justice of the Supreme Court of the Bahamas on 1 February 1991 and then as a Justice of Court of Appeal of The Bahamas from April 1997. On 5 September 2001 he was confirmed as Chief Justice of the Supreme Court of the Bahamas (de facto head of the judiciary of the Bahamas), a position he occupied until 2009.

Education
Hall received his early education at St John's College High School, Nassau, The Bahamas, graduating in 1964, then returning in 1965 to pursue GCE Advanced Level. He received an LL.B. degree with upper-second-class honours from the University of the West Indies, Cave Hill, Saint Michael, Barbados in 1974. and then attended the Council of Legal Education (West Indies) at the Norman Manley Law School in Mona, Jamaica where he graduated in 1976 with a Certificate in Legal Education.

Career
Hall was admitted to the Bar of the Commonwealth of The Bahamas on October 6, 1976, and then practised as an Assistant Counsel at the Office of the Attorney-General of The Bahamas. He was appointed to act as a Stipendiary and Circuit Magistrate from August, 1978, to August, 1980. He then returned to the Office of the Attorney-General and was elevated to Crown Counsel. He became Acting Solicitor-General of The Bahamas in 1983, being confirmed to the post in 1984.

He was appointed Chairman of the 1998 National Crime Commission of The Bahamas and on 4 August 1999 was appointed as the first Bahamian judge on the Inter-American Development Bank Administration Tribunal. In 2002, he became a fellow of the Commonwealth Judicial Institute, Dalhousie University School of Law.

Hall is a member of the Commonwealth Magistrates' and Judges' Association, Commonwealth Lawyers Association and the International Law Association, and holds associate membership in the American Bar Association (Associate Member) and the Canadian Bar Association (Associate Member).

Honours and awards
Hall was knighted by Queen Elizabeth II in 2001, and in 2003 he was appointed a Knight of the Order of St. Sylvester (KSS) by Pope John Paul II. In 2009, he was enrolled as a Knight of the Order of the Holy Sepulchre, also a papal order of knighthood, and currently holds the rank of Knight Commander with Star

In 2004, Hall was awarded the Pelican Alumni Peer award as outstanding alumnus of the University of the West Indies, Cave Hill Campus.

References

1947 births
Living people
Chief justices of the Bahamas
International Criminal Tribunal for the former Yugoslavia judges
International Law Commission officials
People from Nassau, Bahamas
University of the West Indies alumni
Knights Bachelor
Knights of the Holy Sepulchre
People associated with the Norman Manley Law School
Bahamian judges of United Nations courts and tribunals